Hyposmocoma auripennis is a species of moth of the family Cosmopterigidae. It was first described by Arthur Gardiner Butler in 1881. It is endemic to the Hawaiian island of Maui. The type locality is Haleakalā.

The larvae feed on Acacia koa.

External links

auripennis
Endemic moths of Hawaii
Moths described in 1881